The Viga is a river in Kostroma Oblast in Russia, a right tributary of the Unzha.

References 

Rivers of Kostroma Oblast